In cryptography, a client certificate is a type of digital certificate that is used by client systems to make authenticated requests to a remote server. Client certificates play a key role in many mutual authentication designs, providing strong assurances of a requester's identity.

See also 
 Client-authenticated TLS handshake

References

Public-key cryptography
Key management